The Orchestrion Project is an album by American guitarist Pat Metheny released as a double CD in early 2013 on the Nonesuch label following the release of a concert video with the same name in 2012. The album was recorded on tour following Orchestrion, Metheny's album from 2010 which used orchestrionic instruments.

Reception

The album received generally favorable reviews, with Metacritic giving it a score of 83% from 5 reviews. AllMusic awarded the album 4 stars, and in its review Thom Jurek said, "While this album's predecessor evidenced his accomplishment in the instrument's creation and operation, The Orchestrion Project reveals that Metheny's possibilities with it have only been tapped". Dave Gelly of The Observer  said, "I have never heard anything quite like it". BBC Music's Peter Marsh was less impressed stating "The Orchestrion is impressive when seen in action. But Metheny's use of it here delivers a pale, expensive shadow of what a real band can achieve. The project doesn't feel like it has longevity, and this release is for the hardcore only".

Track listing

Personnel 
Pat Metheny – acoustic and electric guitars, guitar synthesizer, orchestrionics

References 

Nonesuch Records live albums
Pat Metheny live albums
2012 live albums